Sim Hyon-jin (born 1 January 1991) is a North Korean professional footballer who plays as a left back and left midfielder.

International career

International goals
Scores and results list North Korea's goal tally first.

Honours 
North Korea U-23
 Asian Games Silver Medal: 2014

References

External links 
 
Sim Hyon-jin at DPRKFootball

1991 births
Living people
North Korean footballers
North Korea international footballers
Association football defenders
2015 AFC Asian Cup players
2019 AFC Asian Cup players
Asian Games medalists in football
Footballers at the 2014 Asian Games
Asian Games silver medalists for North Korea
Medalists at the 2014 Asian Games
21st-century North Korean people